Carioca Maravilhosa is a 1935 Brazilian film directed by Luiz de Barros and starring Carlos Vivan and Nina Marina.

Cast 
Carlos Vivan	...	The Argentinian
Nina Marina	...	Nina
Pedro Dias	...	Comendador Almeida
José Figueiredo	...	(as J. Figueiredo)
Américo Garrido	...	Locutor
Alba Lopes	...	Blonde
Mary Lopes	...	Brunette
Edmundo Maia	...	Nina's uncle

References

External links 
Carioca Maravilhosa on IMDb

Brazilian musical films
1935 films
1930s Portuguese-language films
Cinédia films
Brazilian romantic comedy films
Films directed by Luiz de Barros
Brazilian black-and-white films
1930s romantic musical films